Made in Hungaria is a 2009 Hungarian comedy-musical film written by István Tasnádi, Miklós Fenyő and Norbert Köbli and directed by Gergely Fonyó. Adapted from a stage musical with the same title, it follows the life of a group of teens from Hungary in the late 1960s, while the country was under Communist rule. The film received generally positive reviews.

Plot
Forced to return to Communist Hungary from America with his parents, Miki (Tamás Szabó Kimmel) brings a rebellious attitude, a trunkful of rock records, and an ambition to be the next Jerry Lee Lewis. He falls foul of the family's minder, Comrade Bigali (Peter Scherer), and is forced to perform a nationalistic folk song with Bigali's son in the school talent show. His rocking performance wins everyone over and redeems him with his friends and his girl, Vera (Tünde Kiss).

Cast 
 Tamás Szabó Kimmel as Miki
 Tünde Kiss as Vera
 Iván Fenyő as Röné
  as Marina
 Péter Scherer as Bigali
 Tamás Dunai as Miki's father  
 Éva Vándor as Miki's mother
 Lehel Kovács as Csipu
 Ákos Orosz as Tripolisz
 Vajk Szente as Kisnyirõ
 Géza Hegedüs D. as Miltényi
 Judit Kocsis as Miltényiné
 Péter Egri as Brenner 
 Péter Puskás as Sampon
 Antal Cserna as Balogh

Reception
The film was well received in Hungary and a reviewer for the Associated Press at the Cannes Film Festival described it as a "not very original storyline" redeemed by "top-notch actors", especially Kimmel, whose first lead role this was, and Scherer, who "evoke[s] pathos" despite the silliness of his role as the toadying party functionary.

References

External links
 

2009 films
2000s musical comedy films
2009 comedy films
Hungarian musical comedy films